Kildress Wolfe Tones are a Gaelic Athletic Association club from County Tyrone.

History
The first record of a football match that can be found was played on a June Sunday in 1904 in Gortreagh when a game was arranged to coincide with the formation of a Gaelic football team there. P.T. Devlin told of his memories of that day in a letter to "The Dungannon Observer" dated 8 May 1954.

Kildress was named after Theobald Wolfe Tone. Kildress's team is green, white and orange, the badge bears the symbol of the Beaghmore Stone Circles, a major landmark in Kildress.

Kildress currently play in the Division 2 of the Tyrone League.

Achievements
 Tyrone Intermediate Football Championship 
 1971, 2011
 Tyrone Junior Football Championship (3)
 1966, 1994, 2020
 Tyrone Senior Football League (1) 
 2000

Notable players
 Cathal Corey
 Martin Lennon
 Fran Loughran
 Damian Kelly
 Des Tracey
 Sean Tracey
 Patsy Grimes
 Sean McCullagh
Adam Connolly

Managers

External links
 Kildress Wolfe Tones GAC https://web.archive.org/web/20120725134724/http://www.kildresswolfetones.com/index.php?option=com_frontpage&Itemid=1

Reference List

Gaelic games clubs in County Tyrone
Gaelic football clubs in County Tyrone